Microctenopoma intermedium is a fish in the family Anabantidae found in the Okavango, upper and lower Zambezi, and Kafue Rivers, and St. Lucia basin, as well as in the southern tributaries of the Congo system. It grows to 6.2 cm in total length.

References

intermedium
Fish described in 1920